Nimbe Adedipe Library is located on the campus of Federal University of Agriculture, Abeokuta in Ogun State, Nigeria. It was established in 1988.

Historical Background 
On 1 January 1988, the Federal Government of Nigeria established three university of agriculture. The University of Lagos Abeokuta campus(ULAB) which was at mini-campus at Isale igbein was changed to full-fledged university and the name was changed to University of Agriculture Abeokuta (UNAAB). The library now became UNAAB Library from ULAB library. This university of agriculture later moved to its permanent site at Alabata along Ibadan road where an ultra modern library was build. The Library was later named 'Nimbe Adedipe Library to honour the first Vice-Chancellor of the university, Professor Nurudeen Olorunnimbe Adedipe. The ultra modern building can accommodate 1000 users at a time. The total collection of books at present is 91,800 titles while the total collection of journals on the shelves at present is 3,723 titles.

Sections and Services 
'Nimjbe Adedipe Library operates the following sections and services

 Selective Dissemination Services
 Reference Services
 Reserved Book Service
 Inter-library Loan Service
 Current Awareness Service
 Bibliography Services 
 User education and information literacy training
 Borrowing Services
 24-hours reading room service which can accommodate 100 users at a time

Automation of the Library 
The automation of the library started in 1994 when the library acquired an IBM personal computer and the TINLIB (The Information navigation Library) library software designed for four work stations through a World Bank Project. This was later upgraded to ten work stations. From the DOS based TINLIB software, the library moved to a more versatile window based GLAS (Graphical Library Automation System) software with capacity to operate 50 work stations within the library. There are terminals in all sections which are connected to the main server. The library during the 2012/2013session acquired KOHA, an Integrated Library Management software that enables users to access the library resources and services anywhere. At present, the library Oline Open Access Cataloque (OPAC) is fully functional making it possible to access bibliographical details of library holdings/resources on line

CD-ROM Databases 
In order to improve literature search and document delivery capacity in the library, the university acquired two CD-ROM databases in 1998. The CD-ROM databases are

 CAB Abstracts on CD-ROM, 1992-2000
 TEEAL (The Essential Electronic Agricultural Library) CD-ROM, 1993-1996

Electronic Databases and E-library  
The library has access to the followings electronic databases

 TEEAL (The Essential Electronic Agricultural Library)
 AGORA (Access to Global On-line Research in Agriculture)
 HINARI (Health International Network Access to Research Initiatives
 Nigerian University Libraries Consortium (NULIC) which provides access to EBSCO Host full text journals in virtually all subjects.

References

Academic libraries in Nigeria
Federal University of Agriculture, Abeokuta
Buildings and structures in Abeokuta
Libraries established in 1988
1988 establishments in Nigeria